Broadbent is an unincorporated community in Coos County, Oregon, United States. Broadbent is on Oregon Route 542 south of Myrtle Point along the South Fork Coquille River. Broadbent has a post office with ZIP code 97414.

The community was named after C.E. Broadbent, who started a cheese factory in what would become Broadbent. The Coos Bay Line of the Southern Pacific Railway opened a station at Broadbent in 1915. The local post office opened on August 19, 1916.

Climate
This region experiences warm (but not hot) and dry summers, with no average monthly temperatures above .  According to the Köppen Climate Classification system, Broadbent has a warm-summer Mediterranean climate, abbreviated "Csb" on climate maps.

References

Unincorporated communities in Coos County, Oregon
Unincorporated communities in Oregon